Intercepting Filter is a JavaEE pattern which creates pluggable filters to process common services in a standard manner without requiring changes to core request processing code.  The filters intercept incoming requests and outgoing responses, allowing preprocessing and post-processing, and these filters can be added or removed unobtrusively without changing existing code.  This pattern applies reusable processing transparently before and after the actual request execution by the front and page controllers.

Structure
Filter manager, filter chain, filters and target are components of the pattern.

Filter manager
This manages filter processing and creates the filter chain with the appropriate filters, in the correct order, and initiates processing.

Filter chain

A Filter Chain is a specific series of filters, composed so as to form a logical chain.

Filters
These are the individual filters that are mapped to a target and their processing is coordinated by filter chain.

Target
This is the resource requested by the client.

Consequences
Following benefits can be considered:
 Improved reusability: Common code is centralized in pluggable components enhancing reuse.
 Increased flexibility: Generic common components can be applied and removed declaratively, improving flexibility.
Reduced performance can be a concern, as unnecessarily long chains of interceptors and filters may hurt performance.

Sample code
Sample code implementation for filters with custom filter strategy is given below.

Code for implementing a filter - debugging filter:
public class DebuggingFilter implements Processor {
  private Processor target;

  public DebuggingFilter(Processor myTarget) {
    target = myTarget;
  }

  public void execute(ServletRequest req, 
  ServletResponse res) throws IOException, 
    ServletException    {
    //Do some filter processing here, such as 
    // displaying request parameters
    target.execute(req, res);
  }
}

Code for implementing a filter - core processor:
public class CoreProcessor implements Processor {
  private Processor target;
  public CoreProcessor()   {
    this(null);
  }

  public CoreProcessor(Processor myTarget)   {
    target = myTarget;
  }

  public void execute(ServletRequest req, 
      ServletResponse res) throws IOException, 
      ServletException   {
    //Do core processing here
  }
}

Code for handling requests:
public void processRequest(ServletRequest req, 
  ServletResponse res) 
  throws IOException, ServletException {
  Processor processors = new DebuggingFilter( 
    new AuthenticationFilter(new CoreProcessor()));
  processors.execute(req, res);

  //Then dispatch to next resource, which is probably 
  // the View to display
  dispatcher.dispatch(req, res);
}

Code for filter manager:
public void processRequest(ServletRequest req, 
  ServletResponse res) 
  throws IOException, ServletException {
  Processor processors = new DebuggingFilter( 
    new AuthenticationFilter(new CoreProcessor()));
  processors.execute(req, res);

  //Then dispatch to next resource, which is probably 
  // the View to display
  dispatcher.dispatch(req, res);
}

Code for filter chain:
public class FilterChain {
  // filter chain 

    // apply filters
    for (final Filter filter : filters)
    {
      // pass request & response through various 
      // filters
      filter.execute(request, response);
    }
  }
}

See also
 Front controller
 Decorator pattern
 Template method pattern
 Interceptor pattern
 Pipeline (software)

References

Software design patterns
Articles with example Java code